Moshe Sabag (born April 27, 1973) is an Israeli football (soccer) player.

Honours
Israel State Cup:
Runner-up (1): 1996

References

1973 births
Living people
Israeli Jews
Israeli footballers
Hapoel Rishon LeZion F.C. players
Hapoel Be'er Sheva F.C. players
Hapoel Ashkelon F.C. players
Hapoel Tzafririm Holon F.C. players
F.C. Shikun HaMizrah players
Hapoel Nahlat Yehuda F.C. players
Maccabi Be'er Ya'akov F.C. players
Liga Leumit players
Israeli Premier League players
Israeli people of Moroccan-Jewish descent
Association football defenders